David Smétanine (born 21 October 1974) is a French Paralympic swimmer.

Personal history
Smétanine was born in Grenoble, France in 1974. He has paraplegia caused by spinal damage after he was involved in a car accident at the age of 21.

In 2008 he was made a Chevalier of the Légion d'honneur, for his services to his sport and his country after his performance at the 2008 Beijing Paralympic Games.

In 2010 he was elected to the Regional Council of the Rhône-Alpes, representing the Socialist Party.

Swimming career
Smétanine first represented France at the 2004 Summer Paralympics in Athens, winning a bronze medal in the 50 metre freestyle event in his category. At the 2008 Summer Paralympics, he won gold in the 100 metre freestyle event and gold in the 50m freestyle, as well as two silver, in the 50m backstroke and 200m freestyle. At the 2012 Games, he won two silver and a bronze.

As of 2008, he was the European record holder in the 50m, 100m and 200m freestyle events, as well as the 50m backstroke.

References

External links 
 
 
 David Smétanine - Montreal 2013 IPC Swimming World Championships at the International Paralympic Committee

1974 births
Living people
French male backstroke swimmers
French male freestyle swimmers
S4-classified Paralympic swimmers
Paralympic swimmers of France
Paralympic medalists in swimming
Paralympic gold medalists for France
Paralympic silver medalists for France
Paralympic bronze medalists for France
Swimmers at the 2004 Summer Paralympics
Swimmers at the 2008 Summer Paralympics
Swimmers at the 2012 Summer Paralympics
Medalists at the 2004 Summer Paralympics
Medalists at the 2008 Summer Paralympics
Medalists at the 2012 Summer Paralympics
Medalists at the World Para Swimming Championships
Medalists at the World Para Swimming European Championships
Université Savoie-Mont Blanc alumni
Chevaliers of the Légion d'honneur
Sportspeople from Grenoble
Swimmers at the 2020 Summer Paralympics
21st-century French people